The Saint-Petersburg University of the State Fire Service of the EMERCOM of Russia is a state institution for the training of specialists in the Russian Ministry of Emergency Situations. It is currently led by Internal Service Major General Bogdan Gavkalyuk.

History

Fyodor von Landesen, was appointed head of the courses. A year after the October Revolution, the courses were reformed into the Fire-Technical School. In 1941, it was renamed into the second fire-technical school of the Fire Defence Troops of the NKVD. On 20 September of that year, the school was disbanded in connection with the outbreak of the Great Patriotic War, with half of the employees and cadets serving in the Red Army to fight the German invaders from the front while the rest remained to put out the fires and keep public order. In 1946, the school reopens its doors, acquiring the name of Leningrad Fire-Technical School. Since 1953, the school has trained firefighters from a number of foreign countries, including Warsaw Pact nations like such as Hungary, and Bulgaria, as well as allied countries such as Mongolia, North Korea, Cuba, Afghanistan, Guinea-Bissau, and Vietnam. In total, the school trained over 1,000 specialists from foreign countries. In 1986, the school was transformed into the Leningrad Higher Fire-Fighting School of the Ministry of Internal Affairs. Eleven years later, the Institute of Fire Safety of the Ministry of Internal Affairs of Russia was created on the basis of the school. It became part of the Moscow University of the Ministry of Internal Affairs in 1998. By government resolution, the St. Petersburg Institute of the State Fire Service was established on 13 August 2002. On its centennial in 2006, it was given the status of a university.

Structure

Representative offices
The university has representative offices in the following cities:

 Almaty (Kazakhstan)
 Makhachkala
 Syktyvkar
 Strezhevoy
 Ufa
 Sevastopol
 Tyumen
 Niš (Serbia)
 Bar (Montenegro)
 Baku (Azerbaijan)

Institutions
 Development Institute
 Institute of Correspondence 
 Institute for Life Safety
 Research Institute for Advanced Research and Innovative Technologies
 Institute of Patriotic Education

Faculties
 Faculty of Engineering
 Faculty of Economics and Law
 Faculty of Training

Departments
 Department of Higher Mathematics and System Modeling
 Department of Mine Rescue and Explosion Safety
 Department of Civil Law
 Department of Protection
 Department of Foreign Languages and Speech Culture
 Department of Forensics and Engineering Expertise
 Department of Mechanics and Engineering Graphics
 Department of Supervisory Activities
 Department of Fire Fighting and Rescue Operations
 Department of Pedagogy and Psychology
 Department of Advanced Training
 Department of Fire Safety and Automated Fire Extinguishing
 Department of Fire Safety of Technological Production
 Department of Fire/Rescue Equipment
 Department of Practical Training
 Department of Applied Mathematics and Information Technology
 Department of Security
 Department of Systems Analysis and Crisis Management
 Department of Theory and History of State and Law
 Department of Labor Law
 Department of Management and Economics
 Department of Fire Safety Fundamentals 
 Department of Physico-Chemical fundamentals of Combustion and Extinguishing Processes
 Department of Physical Fitness
 Department of Philosophy and Social Sciences
 Department of Economics and Law (IBI)

Siberian Fire and Rescue Academy 
On 1 September 2008, the Siberian branch of the university was established in the city of Zheleznogorsk, Krasnoyarsk Territory. It is the only higher educational institution of EMERCOM beyond the Ural Mountains, serving the regions of Siberia and the Russian Far East. In 2011, it was renamed to the Siberian Institute of Fire Safety. On 1 March 2013, the institute became the Siberian Fire and Rescue Academy. Presently, the academy is not part of the university and functions as an independent institution. In 2014, the first graduation took place.

Activities 
The university's goals are to support the development of a security system in the field of preventing and eliminating the consequences of natural and man-made disasters. One of the major projects in which the university took part was the creation of a research complex called the Vytegra Training and Rescue Center in the Vytegorsky District of the Vologda Region. University cadets undergo additional training outside of curriculum under the "Initial Rescue Training" program, which includes practical training at the rescue center and the university's training complex in the Leningrad Oblast. Since 2008, employees of the fire and rescue services of Jordan, Bahrain, Azerbaijan, Mongolia and Moldova have been trained in the International Civil Defense Organization at the university under advanced training programs. On 16 October 2014, on the occasion of the 70th anniversary of the Liberation of Belgrade, representative office of the university was opened on the basis of the Russian-Serbian Humanitarian Center in the city of Niš. Since 2014, the university has been providing advanced training for specialists from Serbia through the center. On 1 March 2013, a new branch of the university was opened on Russky Island in Vladivostok. The university maintains close ties with fire and rescue schools of Belarus, Germany, Kazakhstan, Canada, United States, France, Finland and other countries. On 1 December 2016, the university was declared a laureate in the nomination "The best educational organization of higher education of the EMERCOM of Russia".

Criticism 
According to a study by Dissernet, there a number of thesis statements and texts which were written by cadets with violations of academic ethics. It also found more than 15 teachers of the university with similar violations in relation to dissertations.

Student life

Cadets are annual participants in Victory Day Parades on Palace Square.

Participation in emergency response situations
As part of an initiative in 2010, the university began training specialists in high-risk rescue operations, and in 2012 began training cadets with in emergency humanitarian response.

Special units/clubs

Band
The school military band participates in events and supports university functions such graduation and sports games.

Honour guard
The guard of honor platoon is participant in all the university's ceremonial events. At the invitation of various city organizations, it participates in demonstrations and civil/military parades. It is a participants in numerous events in the city of St. Petersburg and the Leningrad Oblast. It is an annual participant in the events for the year in St. Petersburg and Veliky Novgorod. They have also performed at the opening of the hockey championship in the Ice Palace. In 2018, an honour guard was formed at the Siberian academy.

Other
Ony 13 May 2016, the university hosted a constituent meeting a school based organization called the "Club of Graduates".

Sports
The university regularly holds championships in:

Rescue sports
Mini football
Chess
Basketball
Athletics
Volleyball
Kettlebell
Hockey
American football
Cheerleading

Since 2014, the sports club was become a member of the Association of Student Sports Clubs of Russia.

Events
Among the traditional events at the university is the awarding of "Miss and Mr. St. Petersburg University of the State Fire Service of the Ministry of Emergencies of Russia", in which young men and women representing the educational departments of the university take part.

Graduates
Viktor Razin, a commander in the 1st Ukrainian Front
Yevgeny Chernyshov, Head of the Moscow Fire Service
Sergey Postevoy
Fyodor Kharitinov, Hero of the Soviet Union
Oleg Bazhenov, Deputy Minister of EMERCOM

See also 
 Civil Defense Academy of the Ministry of Emergency Situations
 Military University of the Ministry of Defense of the Russian Federation
 University of Civil Protection of the Ministry of Emergency Situations (Belarus)

References 

Ministry of Emergency Situations (Russia)
1906 establishments in the Russian Empire
Educational institutions established in 1906
Military academies of Russia
Firefighting academies